Dattatrey D. Phuge ( – 14 July 2016) was an Indian businessman and millionaire. He gained fame in 2012 after having a $240,000 customized gold shirt made, earning him the nickname Gold Man, and Pimpri Goldman. Phuge was murdered by being beaten to death on the 14th July 2016 over a financial dispute.

Career 
He ran the Vakratund Chit Fund Pvt. Ltd. along with his wife Seema Phuge, a former corporator who belonged to the Nationalist Congress Party. He also ran a co-operative credit society and financial institutions.

Gold Shirt 
In late 2012, Datta Phuge had an opulent $240,000, 22-carat pure gold shirt made for him, decorated with seven Swarovski crystal buttons and an accompanying flashy gold belt in a matching design.
In 2013, he thereby gained an entry in the Guinness Book of World Records for the most expensive shirt. In 2013 Phuge said of his love of gold that "Everybody knows me as the 'gold man' in the whole region. Other rich people spend one crore (10 million rupees) to buy Audis or Mercedes, to buy what they like. What crime have I done? I just love gold. Gold has always been my passion since a young age. I've always worn gold as jewellery in the form of bracelets, rings, chains."

Death 
Datta Phuge was murdered by being beaten to death by twelve men on the 14th July 2016.  He and his son were lured by a friend of Phuge texting him that they were having a birthday party for him. Police said his killers pulled him out of his car, attacked him with a sickle, swords, knives and rods, and then beat him to death with boulders, before fleeing the scene, leaving Phuge, "either dead or dying". Police state they thought the motive for his killing was financial, with reports of "complaints of financial misappropriation against Phuge", and of being "accused of financial irregularities". Phuge's son stated that the killers were friends of his father, and believed they were contracted for the killing. Phuge's son witnessed his father's murder, however managed to escape. After discovery of his body, a manhunt was launched, and roadblocks were set across the city and district. Five people were initially arrested for the killing, with four a few days later, with three others avoiding capture, one of the killers was reported as being Phuge's nephew.

References

People from Maharashtra
Financial services in India
Informal finance
2016 deaths
Deaths by beating
1968 births